Dror Cohen (born 31 March 1968) is an Israeli sailor who has competed in five Paralympics games winning a gold in 2004 Athenes in the three person Sonar-class keelboat.

References

External links
 
 

1968 births
Living people
Israeli disabled sportspeople
Israeli male sailors (sport)
World champions in sailing for Israel
Sonar class world champions
Disabled sailing world champions
Paralympic sailors of Israel
Sailors at the 2000 Summer Paralympics
Sailors at the 2004 Summer Paralympics
Sailors at the 2008 Summer Paralympics
Sailors at the 2012 Summer Paralympics
Sailors at the 2016 Summer Paralympics
Paralympic medalists in sailing
Paralympic gold medalists for Israel